Arbinas, also Erbinas, Erbbina, was a Lycian Dynast who ruled circa 430/20-400 BCE. He is most famous for his tomb, the Nereid Monument, now on display in the British Museum. Coinage seems to indicate that he ruled in the western part of Lycia, around Telmessos, while his tomb was established in Xanthos. He was a subject of the Achaemenid Empire.

Rule
He was the son of the previous Lycian king Kheriga. On his inscriptions, Erbinas is described as a tyrannos, and "the man who rules over the Lycians".

It seems the Lycia kingdom started to disintegrate during the rule of Arbinas, as numerous smaller rulers started to mint coinage throughout Lycia during his reign and after.

Tomb

His monumental tomb, the Nereid Monument, now in the British Museum, was the main inspiration for the famous Mausoleum at Halicarnassus. Using the design of a Greek Temple for the building of a tomb was unheard of in mainland Greece. According to Melanie Michailidis, though bearing a "Greek appearance", the Nereid Monument, the Harpy Tomb and the Tomb of Payava were built according main Zoroastrian criteria "by being composed of thick stone, raised on plinths off the ground, and having single windowless chambers". The Nereid Monument was the main inspiration for the famous Mausoleum at Halicarnassus.

Coinage

References

Sources
 

4th-century BC Iranian people
Rulers in the Achaemenid Empire
Lycians